Armas Äikiä (1904–1965) was a Finnish communist writer and journalist. He wrote the Anthem of Karelo-Finnish SSR.

In Finland, when the Communist Party was banned, he spent the years 1927–1928 and 1930–1935 in prison, where he wrote defiant poems.  Freed with a conditional release in 1935, he fled across the border to the Soviet Union, which led to the loss of his Finnish citizenship.

During the Winter War, Äikiä served as Minister of Agriculture for the short-lived Finnish Democratic Republic.  He had several collection of poems published in the Soviet Union.  He returned to Finland in 1947, but having lost his citizenship could not participate in politics, working as a reporter instead.

Äikiä's funeral took place in Malmi Cemitary in Helsinki in a tight police protection only present by leaders of the party Aimo Aaltonen, Ville Pessi and president Urho Kekkonen. Äikiä's grave is a communal grave of Finnish Communist Party members.

Bibliography of works
Vallankumousrunoja, 1928 (anthology with other writers)
Kaksi Soturia, 1941 (published in Petroskoi, U.S.S.R.)
Laulu Kotkasta, 1941 (published in Petroskoi)
Tulikehässä, 1943 (published in Petroskoi)
Iskelmiä, 1943 (published in Petroskoi)
Kalterilyyra, 1945 (published in Petroskoi)
Tulikantele, 1947 (published in Petroskoi)
Henkipatto, 1948 (published in Finland by Kansankulttuuri)
Kolmas Tie, 1948
Vladimir Majakovski, 1950
Lotta Hilpeläinen, 1952 (as Viljo Veijo)
Sinisten Silmien Tähden, 1952 (as Viljo Veijo)
Tänään ja Vuonna 1965, 1959
Laulaja Tulvoren Juurella, 1962Stihotvorenija'', 1963

See also

References

1904 births
1965 deaths
People from Priozersky District
People from Viipuri Province (Grand Duchy of Finland)
Communist Party of Finland politicians
Government ministers of the Finnish Democratic Republic
First convocation members of the Soviet of Nationalities
Karelo-Finnish Soviet Socialist Republic people
Finnish writers
Finnish male poets
Communist writers
Finnish expatriates in the Soviet Union
20th-century Finnish poets
People granted political asylum in the Soviet Union
Date of birth missing
Date of death missing
Finnish refugees
Refugees in the Soviet Union
20th-century Finnish journalists